The Fedriga Cabinet is the current region government of Friuli-Venezia Giulia, sworn in on 3 May 2018 after Massimiliano Fedriga formally became President of Friuli-Venezia Giulia. It is the 27th Cabinet of Friuli-Venezia Giulia.

It was formed after the 2018 Friuli-Venezia Giulia regional election by the Lega Friuli-Venezia Giulia (LFVG), Forza Italia (FI), FVG Project (PFVG), Brothers of Italy (FdI) and Responsible Autonomy (AR). Excluding the President, the cabinet comprises ten assessors. 5 are members of the Lega, 2 are members of FI, 1 is member of PFVG, 1 is member of FdI and 1 is independent.

In the Regional Council

Composition

Assessors by party

List of assessors

References 

Politics of Friuli-Venezia Giulia
2018 in Italy